Cardiff railway station is located on the Main Northern line in New South Wales, Australia. It serves the western Newcastle suburb of Cardiff, opening on 14 March 1889, relocating to its present site on 8 June 1902.

Despite being one of the busiest stations in the region, the station long had substandard facilities, in particular, a lack of disabled access. There had been numerous (often contradictory) proposals to either upgrade Cardiff or relocate the station to the abandoned station at nearby Glendale, following community pressure stretching back to the 1990s.

In November 2010, work started on a series of upgrades. These improved the parking and stairs and provided wheelchair access, weather protection, and a lengthened platform capable of accommodating eight carriage trains.

Platforms & services
Cardiff has one island platform with two faces. It is serviced by NSW TrainLink Central Coast & Newcastle Line services travelling from Sydney Central to Newcastle.

Transport links
Hunter Valley Buses operate three routes via Cardiff station:
262: Cameron Park to Charlestown via Constitution Dr
263: Cameron Park to Charlestown
267: West Wallsend to Glendale

Newcastle Transport operates three routes via Cardiff station:
13: Glendale to Newcastle via Cardiff & John Hunter Hospital
29: Glendale to Swansea North via Cardiff and Belmont
44: Warners Bay to Kotara via Glendale, Cardiff & Macquarie Hills

References

External links

Cardiff station details Transport for New South Wales

Easy Access railway stations in New South Wales
Railway stations in the Hunter Region
Railway stations in Australia opened in 1889
Railway stations in Australia opened in 1902
Regional railway stations in New South Wales
Main North railway line, New South Wales
City of Lake Macquarie